Rajendra Dhedya Gavit is an Indian politician and Shiv Sena politician. He is member of the 17th Lok Sabha (2019-2024) from Palghar. He was the tribal development minister in the Congress-NCP alliance government. In 2018 he joined BJP just before the by-poll to Palghar Lok Sabha seat, and won the election. In 2019, he joined BJP's alliance partner Shiv Sena as a tactical decision to contest from Palghar again.

Philanthropy 
He declared a donation of Rs 50 lakh for the upcoming rehabilitation and health centre of the Vithu Mauli Trust for the sake of the malnourished children.

Positions held 
 2018 : Elected to 16th Lok Sabha, by-poll for Palghar
 2019 : Elected to 17th Lok Sabha, again from Palghar

Business 
 He owns and runs an LPG Gas Agency named "Dev Mogra Gas Service" in Mira Road, Mira-Bhayandar, Thane

References

External links

 
  LinkedIn Profile
  Twitter Profile

Living people
Lok Sabha members from Maharashtra
Year of birth missing (living people)
India MPs 2019–present
Bharatiya Janata Party politicians from Maharashtra
Shiv Sena politicians
Indian National Congress politicians
Indian National Congress politicians from Maharashtra